This article details Burton Albion F.C.'s 2010–11 season in League Two. This season is The Brewers' second season in The Football League, having finished 13th in the previous campaign. The season also marks the 60th anniversary of the club.

Events
This is a list of the significant events to occur at the club during the 2010–11 season, presented in chronological order (starting from 1 June 2010 and ending on the final day of the club's final match in the 2010–11 season). This list does not include transfers or new contracts, which are listed in the transfers section below, or match results, which are in the fixtures section.

June

4 June: Paul Peschisolido announces that the Brewers' reserve team has been axed in favour of pre-arranged friendly matches.
16 June: The fixtures for the League Cup are revealed. Burton will travel to Cardiff City on the week beginning 9 July 2010, later confirmed to be 11 July 2010.
17 June: The fixtures for the 2010–11 League Two campaign are revealed. Burton start the season on 7 August at home to Oxford United and will also finish at home to Accrington Stanley on 7 May.

July

1 July: The Brewers announce the opening of the club's Centre Of Excellence. Gareth Holmes is hired to head the centre, alongside new Head Of Scholars Mike Whitlow, and existing youth team coach Mark Sale.
2 July: The players return for pre-season training with new faces Darren Moore and Adam Legzdins.
5 July: Staffordshire County Council grant the Pirelli Stadium a renewed safety certificate.
31 July: The Brewers are handed a bye to head through to the Second Round of the Northern Section East of the Football League Trophy.

August
3 August: Darren Moore is announced as the new club captain, replacing former captain Darren Stride. The new squad numbers are also announced, with Moore occupying Stride's vacant number 7 shirt.
7 August: The League Two season kicks off for the Brewers, culminating in a goalless draw with Oxford United. New captain Darren Moore, Adam Legzdins, Nathan Stanton, Adam Bolder and Lewis Young all make their competitive debuts.
12 August: The Brewers are again eliminated from the League Cup at the 1st round stage, being defeated 4–1 away Cardiff City after extra time.
19 August: It is revealed that the Brewers spent £4,960 in agents' fees during the 2009–10 season, the eighth highest in League Two in figures released by The Football League.
31 August: The Brewers announce the opening of the Burton Albion Community Trust as a means to deliver programmers within the local community. Andy Taylor is installed as head of the trust.

September
4 September: The Brewers are handed a home tie with Rotherham United in the Football League Trophy. Later that day Aaron Webster makes his 500th appearance for the Brewers in the match against Hereford United. He marks the occasion with two assists contributing to a 3–0 victory over the Bulls. The match also sees Nathan Stanton sidelined for up to six weeks with a hamstring injury.
8 September: The Brewers are drawn away to Bedworth United in the First Round of the Birmingham Senior Cup.
11 September: Shaun Harrad strikes the first hat-trick of the season for the Brewers in a 3–3 draw against Rotherham United. The match also sees the return of Ryan Austin, having been sidelined since November 2009, and the professional debut of Kevin Grocott.

October

4 October: Shaun Harrad is named PFA League Two Fans' Player of the Month for September.
4 October:  James Ellison is stabbed in the back whilst on a night out in Liverpool city centre. Paul Peschisolido confirms that he has received no major injuries whilst requiring internal and external stitching, and leaves hospital the following day.
6 October: The Brewers continue their poor run of results in cup competitions by being eliminated at the first hurdle in the Football League Trophy by Rotherham United.
12 October: The Brewers are also eliminated from the Birmingham Senior Cup in the opening round falling victim to Bedworth United.

Club

Team Kit

As with previous seasons, the kit supplier remains Tag Leisure. The club's main sponsor is Mr. Cropper Ltd., who sign a minimum 2-year deal, replacing Roger Bullivant Ltd. who had been the sponsor for the previous three seasons. The club mascot's official shirt sponsors are Raygar Architectural and Engineering Supplies.

Players
As of 13 October 2010.

Source: Burton Albion
Ordered by position then squad number.
Appearances (starts and substitute appearances) and goals include those in competitive matches in The Football League, The Football Conference, FA Cup, League Cup, Football League Trophy, FA Trophy and Conference League Cup.
1Player/Goalkeeping coach. Oldest registered player in The Football League.
2Club Captain.
3Undisclosed club record transfer fee, reported by Burton Mail to be 20K.

Youth Team Players
As of 6 August 2010.

Source: Burton Albion
Ordered by position then squad number.

Club Officials

Last updated 2 August 2010.
Source: Burton Albion | Club | Who's Who
Includes staff currently registered with club only.

First-team coaching and Medical Staff

Last updated 2 August 2010.
Source: Burton Albion | Team | Management
Includes staff currently registered with club only.

Other Staff

Last updated 10 September 2010.
Source: Burton Albion
Includes staff currently registered with club only.

Former Staff

Ordered by date left club.

Other Information

Fixtures
Legend

Pre-season friendlies

League Two

Results

League table

League Two Results summary

Results by round

FA Cup

League Cup

Football League Trophy

Birmingham Senior Cup

Squad statistics

Player details
As of 8 May 2011. Competitive matches only. Birmingham Senior Cup matches excluded.

Transfers

New Contracts

1Includes a one-year extension based on appearances.
2Includes optional one-year contract based on recovery.

Notes and references

Burton Albion F.C. seasons
Burton Albion